Cadence Bank was a US-based bank with 99 branches in Alabama, Florida, Georgia, Mississippi, Tennessee and Texas. The bank was based in Atlanta, with executive and operations headquarters in Birmingham, Alabama. It was the primary subsidiary of Houston, Texas based Cadence Bancorporation, a bank holding company.

The bank owned the naming rights to the Cadence Bank Amphitheatre in Atlanta.

History
Cadence Bank was founded as the First National Bank of Aberdeen, on April 30, 1887. In 1972, it changed its name to the First National Bank of Monroe County in 1972. In March 1974, it merged with Peoples Bank in Starkville, Mississippi, becoming the National Bank of Mississippi in May of that year. In October 1974, it merged with the National Bank of Commerce of Columbus to become the National Bank of Commerce of Mississippi. In 2005, it changed its name to Cadence Bank, N.A.

The bank's parent company formed in 2009 as Community Bancorp LLC. In 2010, it secured $ of capital commitments. It acquired Cadence Bank in March 2011.

In April 2011, it acquired Superior Bancorp of Birmingham, Alabama in a transaction facilitated by the Federal Deposit Insurance Corporation  after Superior Bank suffered from bank failure.

In November 2011, the bank moved its headquarters from Starkville, Mississippi to Birmingham, Alabama.

In July 2012, it acquired Encore Bank.

In January 2019, the company acquired State Bank. It also moved its headquarters to Atlanta.

In April 2021, Cadence Bancorporation entered into a merger agreement with BancorpSouth Bank; the merged entity uses the Cadence Bank name.

References

External links

Banks based in Alabama
Companies formerly listed on the New York Stock Exchange
Banks established in 1887
Banks disestablished in 2021